The 185th Paratroopers Reconnaissance Target Acquisition Regiment "Folgore" (abbreviated as: 185° RAO) is an Italian Army special forces unit. The regiment is part of the Italian Army's infantry arm's Paracadutisti speciality and assigned to the Army Special Forces Command.

The regiment was the first Italian paratroopers regiment to be formed. The regiment was assigned to the Paratroopers Division, which was intended to parachute onto Malta during the planned invasion of Malta. When the invasion was canceled the division was sent in September 1942 to North Africa as reinforcement for the German-Italian Panzer Army Africa. Before leaving Italy the regiment was detached and used to form the 184th Infantry Division "Nembo". When the Nembo division was sent to Sardinia the regimen was once more detached and sent to Apulia. In July 1943 the regiment fought against the Allied invasion of Sicily. After the announcement of the Armistice of Cassibile on 8 September 1943 the regiment split, with some units joining the German side and some the allied side. In January 1944 the regiment was disbanded and its personnel assigned to the CLXXXV Paratroopers Battalion "Nembo" or the 1st Reconnaissance Squadron "Folgore", which both served on the allied side in the Italian campaign. In 1963 regiment was reformed with two battalions. In 1975 the regiment was reduced to a battalion sized training unit, which was disbanded in 1998. In 2013 the regiment's flag and traditions were assigned to the army's 185th Paratroopers Reconnaissance Target Acquisition Regiment "Folgore", which until then had been assigned the flag and traditions of the 185th Artillery Regiment "Folgore".

History

Formation 
On 1 July 1940 the I Paratroopers Battalion was formed at the Royal Italian Air Force's Paratroopers School in Tarquinia. On 15 July 1940 the battalion ceded its number for reason of precedence to the I Carabinieri Paratroopers Battalion and became the II Paratroopers Battalion. On 1 April 1941 the 1st Paratroopers Regiment was formed in Viterbo with the I Carabinieri Paratroopers Battalion, the II and III paratrooper battalions, and a support weapons company. In June 1941 the I Carabinieri Paratroopers Battalion left the regiment and moved to Libya. As replacement the regiment received the newly formed IV Paratroopers Battalion. On 1 July 1941 the regiment replaced the Support Weapons Company with the 1st Cannons Company, which was equipped with 47/32 anti-tank guns.p. 82

World War II

Battle of Greece 
On 30 April 1941, the last day of the Battle of Greece, three Savoia-Marchetti SM.82 transport planes left Galatina Air Base with 75 paratroopers of the II Paratroopers Battalion. In the early hours of the afternoon the paratroopers conduct the first Italian airborne assault near Argostoli on the Greek island of Cephalonia. The Greek troops on the island surrendered without bloodshed on the same day. The next day the paratroopers commandeered some boats and proceeded to occupy the islands of Zakynthos and Ithaca.

On 1 September 1941 the 2nd Paratroopers Regiment was formed in Viterbo with the V, VI, and VII paratrooper battalions. On the same date the Paratroopers Division was formed in Tarquinia and both regiments were assigned to it. The division was planned to participate in the proposed invasion of Malta and began to train for the operation. The regiment consisted now of the following units:

 1st Paratroopers Regiment
 II Paratroopers Battalion
 4th, 5th, and 6th Company
 III Paratroopers Battalion
 7th, 8th, and 9th Company
 IV Paratroopers Battalion
 10th, 11th, and 12th Company
 185th Cannons Company (with 47/32 anti-tank guns)

In July 1942 the invasion of Malta was postponed indefinitely and after the First Battle of El Alamein the General Staff of the Royal Italian Army decided to sent the Paratroopers Division to Libya as reinforcements for the depleted German-Italian Panzer Army Africa. As the division would be deployed as infantry it was renamed on 27 July 1942 185th Infantry Division "Folgore". On the same date the 1st Paratroopers Regiment was renamed 185th Infantry Regiment "Folgore". However when the division deployed to Libya, the 185th Infantry Regiment "Folgore" remained in Italy and on 15 September 1942 the regiment ceded its II and IV paratrooper battalions to the 187th Infantry Regiment "Folgore" and received the XI Paratroopers Battalion, which was still in the process of being formed, in return.

On 1 November 1942 the regiment was renamed 185th Infantry Regiment "Nembo" and assigned, together with the 184th Infantry Regiment "Nembo", to the newly formed 184th Infantry Division "Nembo". At this time the regiment also included the X/bis Paratroopers Battalion, which was formed after the X Paratroopers Battalion had been disbanded in North Africa due to the losses suffered in Operation Braganza. The regiment consisted now of the following units:

 185th Infantry Regiment "Nembo"
 III Paratroopers Battalion
 7th, 8th, and 9th Company
 X/bis Paratroopers Battalion
 28th, 29th, and 30th Company
 XI Paratroopers Battalion
 31st, 32nd, and 33rd Company
 185th Cannons Company (with 47/32 anti-tank guns)

On 1 February 1943 183rd Infantry Regiment "Nembo" was formed, which included the VIII/bis Paratroopers Battalion, which was being formed as replacement for the VIII Paratroopers Battalion, which in May 1942 had become the VIII Paratroopers Sappers Battalion and been destroyed in the Second Battle of El Alamein. In March 1943 the III Paratroopers Battalion was deployed to the Julian March to fight Yugoslav partisan formations. In April 1943 the battalion was joined by the XI Paratroopers Battalion and the two battalions formed a Grouping under command of the regiment's deputy commander. The grouping operated in the area of Črni Vrh, Vipava, Zadlog, Postojna and Ajdovščina until June 1943. As in May 1943 the 184th Infantry Division "Nembo" was ordered to move to Sardinia the 183rd Infantry Regiment "Nembo" exchanged its not yet fully trained VIII/bis Paratroopers Battalion with the X/bis Paratroopers Battalion of the 185th Infantry Regiment "Nembo".

Invasion of Sicily 
In July the 185th Infantry Regiment "Nembo" and III Paratroopers Artillery Group of the 184th Artillery Regiment "Nembo" were sent to Apulia to guard the airfields on the Salento peninsula. On 10 July 1943 allied forces landed in Sicily and the regiment was shipped to Sicily to reinforce the Axis's last line of defense in the island's north-eastern corner. On 3 August 1943 the regiment took up its positions on the northern slopes of the Peloritani mountains between Barcellona Pozzo di Gotto and Castroreale. However the American Seventh Army's advance was unstoppable and the regiment was forced to fall back to Messina. Allied airpower forced the regiment to abandon all its vehicles and materiel and retreat by foot over the mountains to Messina, from where it was evacuated to Reggio Calabria on 16 August 1943.

Invasion of Italy 
In Calabria the 185th Infantry Regiment was assigned to the 211th Coastal Division, which garrisoned the beaches on the southernmost tip of Italy. The regiment's headquarter and III Paratroopers Artillery Group were at Cittanova, while the regiment's battalions were at Piani di Milea (III), Santa Cristina d'Aspromonte (XI), and Melito di Porto Salvo (VIII/bis).

On 3 September 1943 British and Canadian forces landed on the Calabrian coast: the 5th British Infantry Division between Bagnara Calabra and Villa San Giovanni, and the 1st Canadian Infantry Division between Reggio Calabria and Melito di Porto Salvo. While the units of the 211th Coastal Division quickly surrendered the 185th Infantry Regiment together with German units retreated along the mountainous interior of Calabria. On 4 September the XI Paratroopers Battalion clashed with British forces in Gambarie, while patrols of the VIII/bis Paratroopers Battalion clashed with Canadian forces between Bagaladi and San Lorenzo, after which the battalion began to retreat towards Platì.

The VIII/bis Paratroopers Battalion retreated through the Aspromonte mountains as the main roads along the coast were already under allied control. On 7 September the battalion reached the road passing from Platì to Santa Cristina d'Aspromonte and found it occupied by Canadian forces moving towards Delianuova. Unaware of the presence of the Italian paratroopers the Canadian 1st Battalion, The Loyal Edmonton Regiment and 1st Battalion, The West Nova Scotia Regiment bivouacked on the road and thus blocked the paratroopers route of escape. Early in the morning of 8 September the remaining 400 paratroopers attacked and tried to break through the Canadian lines, however the Canadians prevailed and the VIII/bis Paratroopers Battalion was annihilated.

Armistice of Cassibile 
The news of the Armistice of Cassibile reached the remnants of the 185th Infantry Regiment "Nembo" during the evening of 8 September 1943. The regimental command and XI Paratroopers Battalion were in Cardinale, while the III Paratroopers Battalion was further East in Soveria Mannelli. Without clear orders or news from Rome the regiment split: the units in Cardinale decided to remain there and wait for the arrival of allied forces, while the III Paratroopers Battalion decided to continue retreating with the German 29th Panzergrenadier Division. When news reached the retreating III Paratroopers Battalion on 10 September that King Victor Emmanuel III with the royal family and the Badoglio government had fled Rome and taken refuge with British forces in Brindisi the battalion's 9th Company and some personnel of the 7th Company decided to join the allied side.

Italian Co-belligerent Army

CLXXXV Paratroopers Battalion "Nembo" 
The remnants of the 185th Infantry Regiment "Nembo" joined the Italian Co-belligerent Army and were transferred to Apulia. On 9 January 1944 the regiment and XI Paratroopers Battalion were disbanded and their personnel used to form the CLXXXV Paratroopers Battalion "Nembo". The battalion was equipped with Italian materiel and consisted of a command, a command platoon, the 31st, 32nd, and 33rd paratrooper companies, the 34th Mortar Company equipped with 81mm Mod. 35 mortars, and the 35th Cannons Company equipped with 47/32 anti-tank guns. The battalion was assigned to the brigade-sized I Motorized Grouping, which was assigned to the American Fifth Army and fought in the Battle of Monte Cassino. By March 1944 the I Motorized Grouping had grown to a division-sized unit and was therefore split on 22 March in two brigades and renamed Italian Liberation Corps. The CLXXXV Paratroopers Battalion "Nembo" was assigned to the corps' I Brigade. In September 1944 the Italian Liberation Corps was disbanded and its personnel used to create division-sized combat groups, which were equipped with British materiel. At the same time the CLXXXV Paratroopers Battalion "Nembo" was disbanded and its personnel assigned to the Combat Group "Folgore", which was formed with the remaining personnel of the 184th Infantry Division "Nembo".

1st Reconnaissance Squadron "Folgore" 
The 9th Company of the regiment's III Paratroopers Battalion was the first Italian unit to ally with allied forces in the war against the Germans. Already in September 1943 the company's officers met with officers of the 1st Canadian Infantry Division and offered to carry out reconnaissance and sabotage missions behind German lines. The company won the Allies' trust by undertaking patrols beyond the Biferno river, towards Agnone and Isernia, and later in the upper Sangro valley. The company passed to the British XIII Corps Corps and received reinforcements of about hundred men from the CLXXXV Paratroopers Battalion "Nembo". On 15 January 1944 the company assumed the name of 1st Reconnaissance Squadron "Folgore" (Squadron "F") and continued to operate behind German lines until the middle of March 1944, when it was transferred to Sesto Campano in Apulia for a training cycle with the British Special Air Service that ended in early May. 

Afterwards the squadron conducted reconnaissance missions, patrols, infiltration and sabotage actions behind the German lines. In October 1944 the squadron received additional reinforcements from the disbanded CLXXXV Paratroopers Battalion "Nembo". At the end of March 1945 the squadron came under direct command of the allied 15th Army Group and around hundred of its paratroopers began to train for an airborne operation behind German lines. On 20 April 1945 the paratroopers of the Squadron "F" jumped in Operation Herring, the war's final airborne combat drop, into the area of Poggio Rusco. After the war the 1st Reconnaissance Squadron "Folgore" was disbanded on 15 July 1945 in Fiesole.

Cold War 

On 1 January 1963 the 1st Paratroopers Regiment was reformed in Livorno. The regiment consisted of a command, a command company, the II Paratroopers Battalion, the V Paratroopers Battalion, and a mortar company. The regiment was assigned to the newly formed Paratroopers Brigade, which on 10 June 1967 was renamed Paratroopers Brigade "Folgore".

During the 1975 army reform the Italian Army disbanded the regimental level and newly independent battalions were granted for the first time their own flags. On 30 September 1975 the 1st Paratroopers Regiment and its two companies were disbanded, while its two battalions became autonomous units as 2nd Paratroopers Battalion "Tarquinia" and 5th Paratroopers Battalion "El Alamein". On the same day the 
Paratroopers Recruits Training Battalion of the Military Parachuting School in Pisa was renamed 3rd Paratroopers Battalion "Poggio Rusco" and assigned the flag and traditions of the 185th Infantry Regiment "Folgore". The consisted of a command, a command and services platoon, and the 7th, 8th, 9th, and 10th paratroopers recruits companies. The battalion was assigned to the Paratroopers Brigade "Folgore" as the brigade's recruits training battalion.

In 1981 the 10th Paratroopers Recruits Company was renamed 16th Paratroopers Recruits Company, as the 2nd Paratroopers Battalion "Tarquinia" formed a fourth paratroopers company, which was designated 10th Paratroopers Company. In 1986 the battalion was renamed 3rd Airdrop Training Battalion "Poggio Rusco".

Recent times 
In 1996 the battalion moved from Pisa to Scandicci. On 30 June 1998 the battalion was disbanded and the flag of the 185th Infantry Regiment "Folgore" was transferred to the Shrine of the Flags in the Vittoriano in Rome.

On 3 April 2000, the 185th Artillery Regiment "Folgore" was reorganized as target acquisition unit and renamed 185th Field Artillery Regiment (Target Acquisition Paratroopers) "Folgore". In 2002 the regiment became a special operations forces unit and in 2004 it was renamed 185th Paratroopers Reconnaissance Target Acquisition Regiment "Folgore".

In 2013 the Italian Army decided to form an artillery regiment for the Paratroopers Brigade "Folgore", which lacked an artillery unit since the brigade's artillery regiment had become a target acquisition unit in 2000. On 21 June 2013 the 185th Artillery Regiment "Folgore" was reformed in Bracciano. On the same date the reformed regiment received its flag from the 185th Paratroopers Reconnaissance Target Acquisition Regiment "Folgore", which was assigned on the same day the flag and traditions of the 185th Infantry Regiment "Folgore".

On 19 September 2014 the Italian Army's Army Special Forces Command was formed in Pisa and on the same date the 185th Paratroopers Reconnaissance Target Acquisition Regiment "Folgore" was transferred from the Paratroopers Brigade "Folgore" to the newly formed command. On 15 June 2015 the regiment exchanged the paratroopers beret flash with the beret flash of the 1st Reconnaissance Squadron "Folgore" (Squadron "F"). In 2017 the regiment became a special forces unit.

Current structure 
As of 2023 the 185th Paratroopers Reconnaissance Target Acquisition Regiment "Folgore" consists of:

  Regimental Command, in Livorno
 Regimental Command
 Staff and Personnel Office
 Operations, Training and Information Office
 Logistic and Administrative Office
 Command and Logistic Support Company
 3rd Target Acquirers Battalion "Poggio Rusco"
 7th Target Acquirers Company
 8th Target Acquirers Company
 9th Target Acquirers Company
 Operational Support Battalion
 Operational Support Company
 Advanced Training Company
 Target Acquirers Specialization Company

The Command and Logistic Support Company fields the following platoons: C3 Platoon, Transport and Materiel Platoon, Medical Platoon, and Commissariat Platoon. The Operational Support Company consists of a C4 Platoon and an Amphibious Platoon.

External links 
 Italian Army Website: 185th Paratroopers Reconnaissance Target Acquisition Regiment "Folgore"

References

Special forces of Italy
Paracadutisti Regiments of Italy